Mangalbare is a town located in the Deumai municipality in Ilam District in the Province No. 1 of eastern Nepal. At the time of the 1991 Nepal census it had a population of 5,593 persons living in 1005 individual households. Now, Mangalbare and dhuseni have become  municipality combinedly & has been named as Deumai municipality. There are many beautiful places like panitar, gajurmukhi, Deumai river, Gufathumki, etc. People are engaged in Agriculture & some owns shop. Mangalbare bazaar is the hub centre for the neighbors like jitpur, dhuseni, shanti danda, sangrumba, and Phuyetappa. This area is very fertile for the commercial crops such as cardamom, tea, ginger, as well as many horticultural commodities.

References

External links
UN map of the municipalities of Ilam District

Populated places in Ilam District